The Republic of Ireland national under-21 football team, is the national under-21 football team of the Republic of Ireland and is controlled by the Football Association of Ireland. The team played its first match in 1978 and has competed in the UEFA European Under-21 Championship since 1988.

History
As a European under-21 team, the Republic of Ireland participates in the UEFA European Under-21 Championship, which takes place every two years. There is no Under-21 World Cup, although there is an Under-20 World Cup. Ireland did not enter the first five Under-21 Championships, entering for the first time in 1988 but failing to qualify. Ireland have never qualified for the European Under-21 Championships.

UEFA European Under-21 Championship record

*Draws include knockout matches decided by penalty shootout.

UEFA European Under-21 Championship

2023 UEFA European Under-21 Championship qualification

2023 UEFA European Under-21 Championship play-offs 

The four play-off winners qualify for the final tournament.

All times are CEST (UTC+2), as listed by UEFA (local times, if different, are in parentheses).

|}

Results and fixtures

2021

2022

1–1 on aggregate. Israel won 3–1 on penalties and qualified for the 2023 UEFA European Under-21 Championship.

2023

Staff
The Under-21s' management team includes:

Players

Current squad
Players born on or after 1 January 2002 are eligible for the 2025 UEFA European Under-21 Championship.

The following players were called up for the Friendly against Iceland U-21 on 29 March 2023.
Caps and goals updated as of 27 September 2022, after the game vs Israel.

Recent call-ups
The following players have also been called up to the Republic of Ireland under-21 squad in the last 12 months and remain eligible:

INJ Withdrew from latest squad due to injury
WD Withdrew from latest squad
PRE Preliminary squad / standby
SUS Player is suspended
COVID Withdrew from latest squad due to Covid-19 protocols
Game v Republic of Ireland Amateur XI not an official game, therefore no caps given.

Note: Names in italics denote players that have been capped for the senior team.

References

External links
 U21 page on FAI website
 UEFA Under-21 website
 Full U21 results

Ireland
Under-21